The Ardiaei were an Illyrian people who resided in the territory of present-day Albania, Serbia, Montenegro, Bosnia and Herzegovina and Croatia between the Adriatic coast on the south, Konjic on the north, along the Neretva river and its right bank on the west, and extending to Lake Shkodra to the southeast. From the 3rd century BC to 168 BC the capital cities of the Ardiaean State were Rhizon and Scodra.

The Ardiaean kingdom was transformed into a formidable power—both on land and sea—under the leadership of Agron of Illyria. During this time, Agron invaded parts of Epirus, Corcyra, Epidamnos and Pharos in succession, establishing garrisons there. The Ardiaean realm became one of Rome's major enemies, and the primary threat to it in the Adriatic Sea. A series of wars were fought between the Roman Republic and the Illyrian (Ardiaean-Labaeatan) kingdom in the 3rd–2nd centuries BC. Polybius (203 BC–120 BC) wrote that they were subdued by the Romans in 229 BC. The Epitome of Livy reports the Roman consul Fulvius Flaccus put down an uprising in 135 BC undertaken by Ardiaei and Pleraei in Roman Illyria.

In earlier times the Ardiaei were enemies of the Autariatae for a long period over salt sources. Appian (95–165) wrote that the Ardiaei were destroyed by the Autariatae and that in contrast to the Autariatae they had maritime power.

Name

Attestation 
The Ardiaei are attested since the 3rd century BC. They often appear in ancient accounts describing the Illyrian Wars and Macedonian Wars. Their name was written in Ancient Greek as Ἀρδιαῖοι, Ardiaioi, or Οὐαρδαῖοι, Ouardaioi, and in Latin as Vardiaei or Vardaei.

Etymology 
The tribal name Ardiaei may be related to the Latin ardea meaning "heron", a symbol of animal totemism.

Location 

Accounts in ancient sources create much confusion about the original location of the Ardiaei. Up to the 4th century BC, the Ardiaei were not a coastal people, as they were described by later Roman historiography from the mid-3rd century BC onwards. Their inland location in older times can be inferred by the cause of war between them and the Autariatae – a long-running conflict over the possession of salt sources near their common border. If they had inhabited the Adriatic coastal area, they would not have had such a pronounced need to undertake a dangerous war because of the mountain salt springs.

The arrival of the Ardiaei on the coast must have occurred at some time after the mid-4th century BC, as the Periplus of Pseudo-Skylax dating back to that time does not mention this Illyrian tribe at all. At that time the lower course of the Naro river was inhabited by the Manioi, while the middle course was likely inhabited by the Ardiaei. The territory of the Ardiaei and Autariatae must have met somewhere along the upper Naro valley near the 'Great Lake', which was attested in the Periplus and has been identified with Hutovo Blato. The Autariatae most likely inhabited the other side of the lake. During the 2nd century BC the Manioi disappeared from historical sources, being replaced in some of their former regions by the Ardiaei and Daorsi, while some of the earlier Autariatan territories were inhabited by the Narensii. Their tribal name indicates that Narensii certainly inhabited some of the areas along the Naron river, and that they probably appeared in historical sources after the disintegration of the coalition that was dominated by the Autariatae.

In the 3rd century BC, the Ardiaei attained political importance and conquered territories from the Autariatae until they acquired control of the entire Adriatic coast, from the region of the Daorsi at the mouth of the Naro river down to Labeatae around Lake Scodra. It is possible that at that time their capital was in Rhizon in present-day Montenegro. In Roman times the Ardiaei were attested in the area of southern Illyria that was centered around the Bay of Kotor, with Rhizon as a capital city, expanding from the Naro river in present-day Bosnia and Herzegovina and Croatia, along the Adriatic coast southwards to Scodra (another capital of the Illyrian kingdom) in present-day 
Albania, as well as to the broad region of Lissus.

History 

Due to widespread piracy perpetrated in the Adriatic by the Ardiaei and other Illyrian tribes, the Romans campaigned against them in the Illyrian Wars. They were viewed as heavy drinkers by the Greeks.

In earlier times the Ardiaei were enemies of the Autariatae for a long period over salt sources.

The Ardiaei briefly attained military might in 230 B.C. under the reign of king Agron (an Ardiaean by tribal origin). His widow, Queen Teuta, attempted to gain a foothold in the Adriatic but failed due to Roman intervention. Historic accounts hold that King Agron was hired by King Demetrius I of Macedon to repel the invasion of Macedonia by the invading Aetolians. The Ardiaei had 20 decuriae.

The ancient geographer Strabo listed the Ardiaei as one of the three strongest Illyrian peoples – the other two being the Autariatae and the Dardani. Strabo writes; 

King Agron, son of Pleuratus who belonged to the ruling house of the Ardiaei, disposed of the most powerful forces, both by land and sea, of any of the kings who had reigned in Illyria before him.

Theopompus in the second book of his Philippics (History of Philip II of Macedon) write that Ardiaei had 300,000 slaves, who were called Prospelatae, and they were like the Helots.

Ardiaean dynasty 

The following list reports the members of the Ardiaean dynasty documented as such in ancient sources or coinage:
Pleuratus (  280 BC): father of Agron;
Ballaios (  260–230 BC): attested only from silver and bronze coinage, found abundantly along both coasts of the Adriatic;
Agron (– 231 BC): son of Pleuratus; married Triteuta with whom he had Pinnes; he then divorced his first wife and married Teuta;
Teuta (231 – 228): married Agron and was queen regent for Pinnes after Agron's death;
Demetrius (  228 – 219 BC): married Triteuta and was king regent for Pinnes after Teuta's abdication;
Pinnes (220 – after 217): son of Agron and Triteuta.

The branch of Scerdilaidas, and his successors Pleuratus III and Gentius, is generally considered a Labeatan dynasty, that emerged after the fall of Agron and Teuta in the First Roman–Illyrian War. Indeed, the Illyrian king Gentius is also attested as reigning among the Labeatae. It is possible that the decline of the Ardiaean dynasty after Queen Teuta's defeat in the First Illyrian War against Rome caused the emergence of the Labeatan dynasty on the political scene.

See also 
List of Illyrian peoples and tribes

References

Sources 

Illyrian tribes
Ancient tribes in Albania
Ancient tribes in Bosnia and Herzegovina
Ancient tribes in Croatia
Ancient tribes in Serbia
Ancient tribes in Montenegro
History of Dalmatia
Illyrian Albania
Illyrian Bosnia and Herzegovina
Illyrian Croatia
Illyrian Serbia
Illyrian Montenegro
Tribes conquered by Rome
Tribes conquered by the Roman Republic